The Allentown Chiefs were a minor league baseball team.  They played in the Class A Eastern League, and started the 1957 season in Syracuse, New York.  The team was purchased by the Boston Red Sox and was moved to Allentown, Pennsylvania, mid-season on July 13, 1957, and finished the season playing at Breadon Field in Whitehall Township, just north of Allentown.

The 1957 team was not affiliated with any major league team, however, the Chiefs were a longtime affiliate of the Detroit Tigers prior to the 1957 season.    After finishing the season in Allentown, the team was re-designated as the Allentown Red Sox, with Boston moving their Eastern League Class A team from Albany, New York, to Allentown for the 1958 season.

A new Detroit-affiliated team in Lancaster, Pennsylvania, began operations for the 1958 Eastern League season.

Team
 1957 Season (Combined Syracuse/Allentown)
 Won: 56  Lost: 84  Pct: .400   5th Place Eastern Division, 19 GB
 Manager: Frank Calo

1957 Complete Team Statistics

Major league players
 Jim Kirby
 Chicago Cubs, NL, 1949
 Bob Moorhead
 New York Mets, NL, 1962, 1965
 John Romonosky
 Chicago White Sox, AL, 1948, 1950, 1951
 Cliff Ross
 Cincinnati Reds, NL, 1954
 Marv Rotblatt
 Chicago White Sox, AL, 1948, 1950, 1951

See also

 Sports in Allentown, Pennsylvania
 History of baseball in Allentown, Pennsylvania

Notes

References

  baseball-reference.com (All team and player statistics and teams)

1957 establishments in Pennsylvania
1957 disestablishments in Pennsylvania
Baseball in Allentown, Pennsylvania
Baseball teams disestablished in 1957
Baseball teams established in 1957
Eastern League (1938–present) teams
Defunct baseball teams in Pennsylvania
Defunct Eastern League (1938–present) teams
Syracuse Mets